Here are the Billboard magazine Hot 100 number one hits of 1968.

That year, 10 acts hit number one for the first time, such as John Fred and His Playboy Band, The Lemon Pipers, Paul Mauriat, Otis Redding, Bobby Goldsboro, Archie Bell & the Drells, Herb Alpert, Hugh Masekela, Jeannie C. Riley, and Marvin Gaye. Otis Redding, after his death in late 1967, was the first artist to hit number one posthumously.

Chart history

Number-one artists

See also
1968 in music
List of Billboard number-one singles
List of Cash Box Top 100 number-one singles of 1968

Sources
Fred Bronson's Billboard Book of Number 1 Hits, 5th Edition
Joel Whitburn's Top Pop Singles 1955-2008, 12 Edition
Joel Whitburn Presents the Billboard Hot 100 Charts: The Sixties
Additional information obtained can be verified within Billboard's online archive services and print editions of the magazine.

References

1968 record charts
1968